The Pitcairn Islands consist of four islands: Pitcairn Island (a volcanic high island), Henderson Island (an uplifted coral island), and two coral atolls, Oeno Island  and Ducie Island.

Location

The Pitcairn Islands as a group of islands in Oceania:()
 Pitcairn Island (main island)
 Henderson Island
 Ducie Island
 Oeno Island

Situated in the South Pacific Ocean, about one-half of the way from Peru to New Zealand, they are one of the most remote sites of human habitation on Earth.

The only inhabited island, Pitcairn, is at 25.04 south, 130.06 west.

Area

Total: 
Land: 
Water: 

Land boundaries

Coastline

Maritime claims
Exclusive economic zone:

Territorial sea:

Climate
The Pitcairn Islands have a maritime tropical rainforest climate (Af according to the Köppen climate classification), with the climate being warm and humid year-round, with no dry season. The highest temperature recorded was  during March. Because of its maritime location, the temperature has never dropped below . Adamstown receives  of rainfall annually, with the rain being evenly distributed across the year. The climate of the Pitcairn Islands is modified by southeast trade winds.

Terrain

The Pitcairn Islands have a rugged terrain caused by volcanic formation, with a rocky coastline and cliffs.

Elevation extremes
Lowest point:
Pacific Ocean coastline 0 m (sea level)
Highest point:
Pawala Valley Ridge

Natural resources

Miro trees (used for handicrafts), fish
Note:
manganese, iron, copper, gold, silver, and zinc have been discovered offshore

Natural hazards
Tropical Cyclones (especially November to May)

Environment – current issues
Deforestation (only a small portion of the original forest remains because of burning and clearing for settlement)

Maps

Worldwide map services show very little detail of the islands, and are even of limited use to show the location of them with respect to each other and to other islands, because they are so small and far apart. However, Mapquest zoom level 1 is a suitable map to see the location between Peru and New Zealand.

For the location with respect to French Polynesia, see the inset of :Image:French Polynesia map.jpg.

See also
Nancy Stone

References

External links
Map of Pitcairn showing place names
Map showing location of the Pitcairn Islands with respect to other island groups and to continents

 

pl:Pitcairn#Geografia